Sheldon Gorski is a Canadian ice hockey coach and former right wing who was an All-American for Illinois–Chicago.

Career
Gorski's final season of junior hockey resulted in him leading the SJHL in goals and he signed an athletic scholarship with Illinois–Chicago. He joined the Flames as they were on the ascent and helped the team produce its first 20-win season as a sophomore. An injury limited Gorski in his junior season but he returned in force as a senior, scoring a program record 38 goals and becoming the all-time program leader with 86 markers. He was named as an All-American and led UIC to their best season in 1989, finishing 3rd in the CCHA standings and getting out of the conference quarterfinals for the only time in program history.

After graduating with a degree in Kinesiology and Exercise Science, Gorski took a year off before pursuing a professional career. He debuted for the Louisville Icehawks in the ECHL and was an instant success with the team, leading them in scoring for their inaugural season. Gorski was again the team's leader in 1992 and pushed the Icehawks all the way to the Riley Cup finals. After a third season of 50 goals, Gorski missed a large chunk of 1994 with an injury and then had to find a new home when the Icehawks suspended operations after the season. He landed with the San Antonio Iguanas, finishing 3rd in team scoring and helping the club reach the Ray Miron President's Cup final.

Gorski was back in both the ECHL and Louisville the following year when a new franchise, the Louisville RiverFrogs, began playing. He twice led the team in scoring but was forced to move once again when the team dissolved in 1998. He split his time between two ECHL teams in 1999 and then ended his playing career with the Rockford IceHogs in 2000.

Immediately after his retirement, Gorski began to work as a teacher at the FranCenter in Darien, Illinois. He also doubled as the lead instructor at the Northern Edge Hockey School for 14 years. In 2015, while remaining a teacher at the FranCenter, Gorski began working both with the Canadian Professional Hockey School and the Sabre Hockey Association as an instructor and coach, all three positions he continues to fulfil as of 2021.

Gorski was inducted into the UIC Athletic Hall of Fame in 2000 and the ECHL Hall of Fame in 2012.

Statistics

Regular season and playoffs

Awards and honors

References

External links

1965 births
Living people
Ice hockey people from Saskatchewan
People from Grenfell, Saskatchewan
Canadian ice hockey right wingers
Melville Millionaires players
UIC Flames men's ice hockey players
AHCA Division I men's ice hockey All-Americans
Indianapolis Ice players
Louisville Icehawks players
San Antonio Iguanas players
Louisville RiverFrogs players
Miami Matadors players
Pensacola Ice Pilots players
Rockford IceHogs (UHL) players